Yalguzag sniper rifle is a bolt-action sniper rifle that fires the 7.62×51mm NATO round used by the Azerbaijani Land Forces.

Users

See also
Istiglal anti-materiel rifle
JNG-90
Accuracy International Arctic Warfare
Sako TRG

External links
 

Azerbaijani inventions
Bolt-action rifles
Sniper rifles
Rifles of Azerbaijan
7.62×51mm NATO rifles